Rockefellera is a fungal genus in the family Pannariaceae. It is a monotypic genus, containing the single species Rockefellera crossophylla. The genus was circumscribed by James Lendemer and Erin Tripp in 2017. The generic name honors the Rockefeller family, "for their century-long support of North American conservation efforts, particularly with respect to national parks."

Rockefellera crossophylla was originally described by American lichenologist Edward Tuckerman as Pannaria crossophylla, based on specimens he collected in New England. He had previously mentioned the species in an 1859 publication by William Nylander, but this was not a validly published name as a type was not indicated.

Because of a dearth of records of the lichen from North America after its initial description, Per Magnus Jørgensen suggested in 2000 that it was potentially extinct in the wild on that continent. Since then several populations have been reported from the Canadian Maritimes, the Ozark Highlands, and the southern Appalachian Mountains.

Description
Rockefellera is distinguished from the closely related genus Protopannaria by having minutely digitate lobes, biatorine apothecia with hymenia that are hemiamyloid, asci that have internal apical ring structures, and smooth ascospores.

References

Peltigerales
Lichen genera
Taxa described in 2017
Peltigerales genera
Fungi without expected TNC conservation status